Highway 33 is a highway in the southern portion of the Canadian province of Saskatchewan connecting Regina (Arcola Avenue) to Stoughton; the highway is divided near Regina.

Route description

Regina
Regina is the only city along Highway 33 and is its western terminus. It is the second largest city of the province of Saskatchewan, and is the capital city. The route follows Arcola Avenue, a limited-access road that travels in a south-east / north-west direction south of Victoria Avenue. The road is named after the town of Arcola. North of Victoria Avenue, Arcola Avenue continues west as an arterial road and becomes Saskatchewan Drive west of Winnipeg Street, passing through Downtown Regina before ending at Lewvan Drive. As Victoria Avenue does not connect with Lewvan Drive, Saskatchewan Avenue functions as the main western approach into downtown.

Highway 33 begins at Ring Road and travels in a south-east / north-west direction for its entire length, though it is designated as east-west. On the outskirts of Regina, it crosses the Regina Bypass, which is part of the Trans-Canada Highway (Highway 1).

Communities

With the advent of motor vehicle transportation and better highways, several small communities started to disappear. The days of trail and horse and buggy necessitated travel between centres which were established approximately 6 miles apart, which is no longer required. The amenities of larger centres have given rise to a lower rural population, and a higher urban population in the province.

East of Regina, Highway 33 passes through McCallum, which is now a ghost town. Richardson first named Richardson Station on the CPR rail line, now adds its population and administrative affairs to Edenwold No. 158 rural municipality. Kronau now adds its population and administrative affairs to Lajord No. 128 rural municipality. Oyama  is now being run as a private camp ground, under the pretense that it has been and is currently supposed to be closed to the public for upgrades to be completed, it is located between Kronau and Lajord. Lajord is too small to be enumerated on its own accord, and is a part of the administrative district of rural municipality of Lajord No. 128.

Sedley is a village which had a population of 322 people in 2001, and is now a village and a part of rural municipality Francis No. 127. Francis, a town of 148 along Highway 33, is at the intersection of Highway 35.

Tyvan combined its population with Wellington No. 97 as of July 1, 1936. Highway 711 intersects with Highway 33 just south of Osage. Osage is a small area with a post office as early as 1903; it combines its population with Fillmore No 96. Fillmore, currently a village of 193, is located at the intersection of Highway 33 and Highway 606.

The village of Creelman with 81 residents in 2006. Heward, a hamlet of fewer than 30 residents, is a part of the rural municipality of Tecumseh No. 65. The post office of Heward began operations April 1, 1904.

Stoughton is located at the intersections of three main highways; Highway 13 (the Red Coat Trail), 33, and Highway 47. The eastern terminus of Highway 33 is at a junction with Highway 47, just north of the intersection with Highways 13 and 47. In 1901, this community was named New Hope, North-West Territories, changing name to Stoughton and moving a little to the south in 1904 when the CPR railway came through the area.  Stoughton with a motto of The Heart of the South East Crossroads of Friendship became a town in 1960 and in 2006 had 653 residents.

Rural municipalities
Local Improvement District number 6 E 2 held its first administrative meeting on June 29, 1904.

December 13, 1909 saw the changeover from Local Improvement District number 6 E 2 to Fillmore No 96. From legislation put into place by Premier Walter Scott December 13, 1909 saw the province divided into Local Improvement Districts of about 3 townships by 3 townships in size.

As travel continues towards Regina the agricultural landscape of the area starts to become interspersed with industrial parks.  The RM of Sherwood No. 159 with a population of 1,075 rural residents in 2006  encompasses the city of Regina.

Major attractions and geophysical features
The terrain along Highway 33 is mainly undulating agricultural wheat and grain fields. Grain and livestock production is the main economic industry in the area. The name  Lajord translated from Norwegian meaning flat place aptly describes the scenery.
The Stoughton Campground along Highway 33 features swimming pool, tennis court, ball diamond and golf course. The Red Barn, and Stoughton and District Museum conserve the past, while parks and a golf course provide recreation in this town.

Osage Wildlife Refuge is a conservation area on the west of Highway 33, about 3 miles south-east of Osage.

Wascana Creek meanders along the western side of Saskatchewan Highway between Tyvan and Regina giving rise to the Wascana Valley. Highway 33 crosses the creek at Tyvan, and the creek makes a hairpin curve and peters out to the north-east of town.

Between Lajord and Kronau is the regional park on the east side of the highway featuring the Oyama Regional Park Golf Course which opened in 1971.

History
November 9, 1904 saw the arrival of the CPR rail line. The Souris-Arcola-Regina Section branch line was the longest piece of straight track worldwide, and still has the claim of being the longest straight track of North America. Highway 33 follows along this surveyed rail line. The CPR served Stoughton, Heward, Creelman, Fillmore, Osage, Tyvan, Francis, and Sedley. The Hanson brothers from Lajord developed one of the first swathers in use in Saskatchewan.

Major intersections
From west to east:

Gallery

References

External links
A document from Saskatchewan Highways and Transportation: Winter Highway Conditions
Saskatchewan Highways Website-- Highway Numbering
Lajord, Saskatchewan
Saskatchewan Road Map RV Itineraries
Big Things of Canada, A Celebration of Community Monuments of Canada
Osage, Saskatchewan

033
Roads in Regina, Saskatchewan